Twenty Twisted Questions is a 1992 LaserDisc by American avant-garde group "The Residents". It is a compilation of the band's history up to Freak Show, their then multimedia project. The footage was released in Europe as a PAL VHS without the LaserDisc features.

Track listing

Side 1

Video and Film Art
 The Third Reich 'n Roll
(Swastikas on Parade)
 Eloise
 One Minute Movies
 Moisture
 Act of Being Polite
 Perfect Love
 Simple Song
 This is a Man's Man's Man's World
 Earth Vs. The Flying Saucers
 Don't Be Cruel
 Freak Show
 Everyone Comes to the Freak Show
 Harry the Head
 Nobody Laughs When They Leave

Side 2

Performance Art
 The Mole Show (Narrated by Penn Jillette)
 The 13 Anniversary Show
 Where is She?
 Cube-E
 Buckaroo Blues
 Black Barry
 The Baby King

Music and Graphic Arts
Featured discography from The Residents from 1972 (Santa Dog) to 1991 (Freak Show)

End Credits, Bonus Track
 Production Credits
 Ty's Freak Show (This track was recorded on November 17, 1991 using NEC's video editing software at the Fairmont Hotel in San Jose, CA)

Production Credits

Critical response
At the time, Entertainment Weekly video critic Ty Burr rated it a C+. He said that  the video "...is for undiscriminating fans only: It's the high-tech version of a souvenir T-shirt."

References

The Residents albums
1992 compilation albums
1992 video albums
LaserDisc releases